Battery B, 1st Battalion Tennessee Light Artillery was an artillery battery that served in the Union Army during the American Civil War.  It was initially organized as the 1st East Tennessee Battery.

Service
The battalion was organized in Memphis, Nashville, and Knoxville, Tennessee, from June 13, 1863, through October 16, 1863, under the command of Lieutenant Colonel Robert Clay Crawford.  Battery B was raised and mustered in at Lexington, Kentucky, from eastern Tennessee refugees for three years service on April 16, 1863, under the command of Captain Robert Clay Crawford.

Battery B was attached to District of Kentucky, Department of the Ohio, to August 1863. Willcox's Division, Left Wing Forces, XXIII Corps, Department of the Ohio, to January 1864. District of the Clinch, Department of the Ohio, to April 1864. 1st Brigade, 4th Division, XXIII Corps, Department of the Ohio, to February 1865. 1st Brigade, 4th Division, District of East Tennessee, to March 1865. 2nd Brigade, 4th Division, District of East Tennessee, to July 1865.

Battery B, 1st Battalion Tennessee Light Artillery mustered out of service at Nashville, Tennessee, on July 20, 1865.

Detailed service
From Lexington, the battery moved to Nicholasville, Kentucky, for drill and instruction.  In May 1863 the battery moved to Camp Nelson, Kentucky.  On July 16, 1863, the battery moved to Somerset, Kentucky.  It performed duty in Kentucky until August 1863. Action at Tripletts Bridge June 16. Operations against Scott in eastern Kentucky July 25-August 6. Expedition to Cumberland Gap August 17-September 7. Winter's Gap August 31. Operations about Cumberland Gap September 7–10. Duty at Cumberland Gap until May 1865, and in District of East Tennessee until July.

Commanders
 Captain Robert Clay Crawford - promoted to lieutenant colonel of the battalion
 Captain William O. Beebe

See also

 List of Tennessee Civil War units
 Tennessee in the Civil War

References
 Dyer, Frederick H.  A Compendium of the War of the Rebellion (Des Moines, IA:  Dyer Pub. Co.), 1908.
Attribution

External links
 Brief unit history, including officers' names, regimental strengths, etc.

Military units and formations established in 1863
Military units and formations disestablished in 1865
Units and formations of the Union Army from Tennessee
1865 disestablishments in Tennessee
1863 establishments in Tennessee
Artillery units and formations of the American Civil War